Kids By The Dozen is a reality television series about large families. The series was produced by Powderhouse Productions.

Cast

Arndt Family
 Parents: Rick & Cathy (14 children)
 Children: Paul, John, Mark, Luke, Jude, James, Philip, Seth, Jacob, Nathan, Mary Elizabeth, Caleb, Peter, and David.

Jeub Family
 Parents: Chris & Wendy (16 children)
 Children: Alicia, Alissa, Cynthia, Lydia, Isaiah, Micah, Noah, Tabitha, Keilah, Hannah, Josiah, Havilah, Joshua, Priscilla, Zechariah, and Elijah
 As of February 2012 the children ranged in age from 28 years old to 9 months.

Heppner Family
 Parents: DuWayne & Miriam (17 children)
 Children: Jemima, Benjamin, Samuel, Josiah, Joseph, Abraham, Micah, Moses, Solomon, Joanna, Susanna, Abigael, Elizabeth, Zachariah, Rebecca, Rachael, and Avianna (all biological except one).

Sentman Family
 Parents: John Robert & Beth (17 children)
 Children: Jessica Leigh, 30, Joseph Gabriel, 29, Mary Rebecca, 28, Anna Christine and John Andrew, 26, Alexis Gerard, 24, Michael Dominic, 22, Philip Gregory, 21, Philomena Therese, 19, Vincent Thomas, 17, Virginia Clare, 16, Richard Louis, 14, Edmund Campion, 13, William Mahlon, 11, Ryan Patrick, 9, Robert Hugh, 8, Timothy Daniel, 4 as of 2007 - Grandchildren: Mahdi, Joseph, Sophia, Abe, Daniel, and Sajed Jaffal as of 2012

Cason Family 
 Parents: Dave & Christi (18 Children )
 Children: Jessica, Chad, Dalton, Austin, Bailey, Gage, Kaylee, Harper, Emma, Rebekah, Trevor, Walker, Morgan, Laura, Sawyer, Nathaniel, Vaughn and baby Farryn in November 2015.  Daughter Jessica had Jaedyn (girl) born February 2013, the Cason's first Grandchild. Jessica gave birth to her 2nd daughter Charlie in November 2015. Third granddaughter Melody was born in 2017.

Gonya Family
 Parents: Jay & Janine (12 children as of 2007)
 Children: Joshua, Erin, Emily, Patrick, Luke, Olivia, Peter, James, Joseph, Maggie, William, Grace.
In the four years following the show they had had four more children (twins Michael and Meaghan, followed by singletons Bridgette and Caroline), making 16 children in total.

Clarke Family
 Parents: Tim & Michele Clarke.
Children:  Timothy, Bradley, Kaylee** (Married to Bradley), Dylan, Amanda, David, Meghan, Emily, Brendan, and Logan.
As of 2013 10 Children.

References

External links

2000s American reality television series
2009 American television series debuts
TLC (TV network) original programming
Television series about children
Television series about families